The Krasnaya is a river in Russia's Kaliningrad Oblast and Poland's Warmian-Masurian Voivodeship.

The Krasnaya flows through Romincka Forest and flows into the Pissa at Gusev. Krasnolesye, Russia is one of the many villages and towns located on the river.

Rivers of Poland
Rivers of Kaliningrad Oblast
Rivers of Warmian-Masurian Voivodeship